The Taltoli Jama Mosque, formerly known as the Munshibari Jama Mosque, is a 19th-century Jama Masjid of the village of Taltoli in Chandpur District, Bangladesh.

History
It was completed in 1891 in British India by Ab'dul Hamid Munshi of the Munshibari estate by a pond owned by the Munshibari family.

Since then, the Imams and Muezzins called the local Muslims to the congregational mosque (then known as the Munshibari Masjid), where Jumu'ah or weekly Friday noon congregation prayers took place.

Architecture
Built by local masons, the structure is of Indo-Saracenic and Indo-Islamic blend. It has four minarets in four corners of the structure, a hallway, the Mihrab in the main prayer room (musallah).

The Mihrab has a Minbar for regional khatibs to deliver sermons (khutbah) The exterior has a corridor by the pond for ritual purification (Wudu). The stairs lead to the top of the mosque. The structure houses a living quarter for the Islamic scholars and carved in library in the main hall for scriptures used during Madrasah lessons.

See also
 List of mosques in Bangladesh

References

External links

 Official website of the Ministry of Religious Affairs

Mosques in Bangladesh
Mosques completed in 1891